Zinc finger protein 530 is a protein that in humans is encoded by the ZNF530 gene.

References

Further reading 

Human proteins